Cycas pachypoda is a species of cycad endemic to Vietnam. It is found in Binh Thuan, Ninh Thuan, and possibly Dong Nai provinces, southern Vietnam.

References

pachypoda
Endemic flora of Vietnam